Robin Henkens (born 12 September 1988 in Hasselt) is a Belgian football midfielder who plays for Lommel SK.

Career
As of December 2008 he was contracted to Genk, but was being linked to a move to STVV. However, in February 2009 he was loaned from Genk to Kvsk United until the end of the season.

In August 2009, he made a permanent move to KVSK United, and In the 2009–10 season he played 32 league games for them in the Belgian Second Division. As of the 2010–11 season KVSK United changed their name to Lommel United.

He moved to KV Mechelen for 2011–12, and made 10 appearances for them in his first season. In April 2013 it was announced that he would be joining Waasland-Beveren for the 2013–14 season.

In 2013/14 he made 33 league appearances for Waasland, scoring 4 goals. His contract at the club ended in summer 2015.

In December 2015 he was signed by Westerlo, having been a free agent.

References

External links
 
 

Living people
Belgian footballers
K.R.C. Genk players
K.V. Mechelen players
Belgian Pro League players
Challenger Pro League players
Association football midfielders
1988 births
Sportspeople from Hasselt
Footballers from Limburg (Belgium)
S.K. Beveren players
Lommel S.K. players
K.V.C. Westerlo players
21st-century Belgian people